The Champaign–Urbana Mass Transit District (colloquially known as the MTD) is a mass transit system that operates in the Champaign–Urbana metropolitan area in eastern Illinois. MTD is headquartered in Urbana and operates its primary hub at the intermodal Illinois Terminal in downtown Champaign.

At the University of Illinois Urbana–Champaign, which lies within the District, all students pay a $59 transportation fee every semester in exchange for unlimited use of the bus services. Primarily funded by property taxes, MTD currently levies about 28 cents of property taxes per $100 of assessed valuation; bus fares are another primary source of funding. MTD is led by a seven-member Board of Trustees, who are appointed by the Champaign County Board. Buses are produced by the Canadian company New Flyer and the American company Gillig. MTD introduced hybrid buses to its fleet in Fall 2009, and currently the vast majority of its buses are hybrid. Minibuses used for paratransit service, SafeRides service, and (occasionally) fixed route service, are cutaway vans with a Ford E series chassis.

Public transit before the MTD 
In 1854, the first rail lines in the region were laid 2 miles west of Urbana by the Illinois Central Railroad. The city of Urbana initially wanted nothing to do with the new railroad economy, so a new city, originally named West Urbana, was created to help serve the needs of the railroad. In 1860 West Urbana was renamed Champaign, and subsequently developed into an important railroad town. The station served as a stopover on the way from New Orleans to Chicago, and vice versa. In 1909 this was expanded to also include service from Chicago to Jacksonville, Florida.

The first trolley service in the area was established in 1863, when the Urbana Railroad Company was created to link Urbana and Champaign. These first trolleys were drawn by horses or mules. By 1890, work had begun on an electrified trolley system under the auspices of William B. McKinley. At its peak, this system had as many as 20 routes, including a nighttime "Owl Service" linking Champaign and Urbana.

Interurban streetcar service was also supplied to the area (and indeed to much of Illinois) by the Illinois Terminal Railroad Company, another brainchild of William McKinley. McKinley's scheme of selling electricity from the interurban system to the surrounding towns led to the founding of the Illinois Power and Light Company.

In 1901, the Illinois Motor Transit Company introduced a city bus system to the region, but they went bankrupt within the year. However, the inability of the trolley system to lay enough track to fully serve the area prompted the 1925 addition of another bus system by National City Bus Lines, a subsidiary of General Motors. In 1936, as was happening in other places across the nation, National City Bus Lines purchased the trolley system from the Illinois Power and Light Company and dismantled it. The last trolley operated on 10 November 1936. Within one month bus lines had become the dominant form of transportation in the city under the new name "Champaign–Urbana City Lines."

Ridership on the Champaign–Urbana City Lines was high, reaching 1 million passengers served in 1958. Like most of America however, buses in Champaign–Urbana became less popular with the advent of affordable automobiles. On November 17, 1970, P.E. Cherry, the manager of Champaign–Urbana City Lines, published an article in the Courier stating that declining ridership, aging buses, and a rising deficit would force the line to close. The Illinois Commerce Commission conducted a hearing on the petition to close the city lines and suggested that rather than close the lines, a referendum should be drafted to create a mass transit district.

History of the modern MTD 

On November 24, 1970, a mere week after the lines looked to be closing, the referendum was approved and Thomas Evans was appointed the director of the new mass transit district. The new MTD began operation on August 2, 1971, for a fee of $0.30 per ride with free transfers on buses which allowed one to navigate the area using several different bus lines. On May 13, 1971, a federal grant was procured to help this both fledgling and historic transit district rework its fleet of buses, purchasing fifteen new buses and ten used buses from Peoria, Illinois. In 1973, the MTD expanded its routes to include the university, offering routes around the university and to the graduate housing complex. Fees for University students were at a reduced rate, paying only $0.10 per ride, or purchasing a $20 semester pass for unlimited rides.

In 1984, MTD received national recognition when it was chosen as the 7th best transportation system in America, outranking the systems provided by many larger cities across the country. In 1986 and 1994, it was the recipient of the American Public Transit Association's Outstanding Achievement Award.

In 1993, MTD introduced low-floor buses to its fleet with an order of 15 New Flyer D40LF buses. MTD was one of the first transit agencies in the United States to introduce low-floor buses.

In 1999, Illinois Terminal was created in downtown Champaign which serves as both a transit hub for the MTD and a connection between the MTD, Amtrak and intercity bus lines.

In 2001, MTD purchased its first new articulated buses, with an order of 12 New Flyer D60LF buses. In 2009, MTD introduced hybrid electric buses with the introduction of five Gillig BRT 30' midibuses (since retired) and four New Flyer DE60LFR articulated buses.

In fall 2021, MTD introduced hydrogen fuel cell buses to its fleet, with two New Flyer XHE60 articulated buses. This represents the first commercial order for articulated hydrogen buses in the United States.

Today the MTD provides over 11 million rides per year.  The current one-way bus fare is $1. Transfers are free and may be used to connect with another route at transfer points to complete a one-way trip. An annual bus pass can be purchased for $60. The annual pass allows unlimited rides. An all-day pass, good for either Saturday or Sunday, can be bought for $2. All University of Illinois students, faculty, and staff have unlimited access to all routes and services.

Fatal accidents 
Prior to 2004, MTD never had an accident involving a fatality. Since 2004, there have been two fatal accidents involving pedestrians and MTD buses. Both cases involved University of Illinois students on campus:
 October 27, 2004: Carolyn B. Jeffers, a pedestrian, was struck and killed by a 26 Pack bus at the intersection of S Goodwin Ave and Gregory Dr, Urbana.
 September 29, 2005: Sarah Channick, a pedestrian, was struck and killed by a 22 Illini bus at the intersection of S 6th St and E Chalmers St, Champaign. The Channick family sued MTD; the lawsuit was eventually settled for $1.25 million.

After Channick's death, the governments of Champaign and Urbana, the University of Illinois, and MTD conducted the Campus Area Transportation Study (commonly referred to as "CATS"), which made specific recommendations to improve bus safety on campus.  As of December 2011, two of three proposed phases have been implemented.

Facilities 

Administration and Operations Offices
1101 E. University Avenue, Urbana, IL. 
Maintenance Department and Bus Garage
803 E. University Avenue, Urbana, IL. 
Illinois Terminal
45 E. University Avenue, Champaign, IL. 
Wright Street Transit Plaza
S. Wright Street, between Daniel and John. 
Downtown Urbana Transfer Point
Broadway Avenue just north of Lincoln Square, between Main and Elm.

Bus routes 
Bold – Main portion of route
Hopper interval – Including regular service, for example, 30 minute of yellow and 10 minute of YELLOWHopper means the first 10 and 20 buses are YELLOWhopper and then 30 bus is yellow.
Weekday Daytime Routes

Weekday Evening Routes

Weekday Late Night Routes U of I days only

Saturday Daytime Routes

Sunday Daytime & Late Night Routes
 30 Lavender
 50 Green
 70 Grey
 100 Yellow
 110 Ruby
 120 Teal
 130 Silver
 180 Lime A
 180 Lime B
 220 Illini
 335 SafeRides (flex service)

Bus fleet 

MTD's fixed route fleet consists entirely of buses manufactured by New Flyer Industries. Articulated buses were historically used primarily on routes 12 Teal, 13 Silver and 22 Illini on school days, but due to the COVID-19 pandemic they are now used system-wide to promote social distancing. MTD formerly operated midibuses produced by Gillig and Eldorado National, but they were retired in 2021 and 2017, respectively. MTD also operated Ford E450 and RAM 3500 shuttle buses for SafeRide on campus and ADA services.

Fixed Route Ridership 

The ridership statistics shown here are of fixed route services only and do not include demand response.

See also 
Danville Mass Transit

References

External links 
 Official website
 Champaign–Urbana streetcar history — A work in progress

Bus transportation in Illinois
Champaign County, Illinois
Transit agencies in Illinois
1970 establishments in Illinois